Swordale  may refer to:
Swordale, Isle of Lewis, Scotland
Swordale, Ross-shire, Scotland